Hans Gildemeister and Andrés Gómez were the defending champions but lost in the second round to Craig Campbell and Barry Moir.
Third-seeded pair Laurie Warder and Blaine Willenborg claimed the title by defeating Joakim Nyström and Mats Wilander in the final.

Seeds
The top four seeds received a bye into the second round. A champion seed is indicated in bold text while text in italics indicates the round in which that seed was eliminated.

Draw

Finals

Top half

Bottom half

References

External links

1987 Grand Prix (tennis)
Men's Doubles